Senator Herndon may refer to:

Benjamin Herndon (1748–1819), North Carolina State Senate
Judith Herndon (1941–1980), West Virginia State Senate